Three hundred sixty-nine is the natural number following three hundred sixty-eight and preceding three hundred seventy.

In mathematics 
369 is the magic constant of the 9 × 9 magic square and the n-Queens Problem for n = 9.

There are 369 free octominoes (polyominoes of order 8).

Other uses
369 is also:

 The year 369 or 369 BC
 A Singapore gang, also known as Salakau in Hokkien
 "3-6-9", a song by Cupid featuring B.o.B from Time for a Change
 "369", a song by Buzzcocks

References

Integers